The Treasure of Pleasant Valley is a 1955 historical novel by the American writer Frank Yerby. It was published by Dial Press. Yerby had already produced several bestsellers set in nineteenth century America including The Foxes of Harrow, A Woman Called Fancy and Benton's Row.

Synopsis
During the 1840s Bruce Harkness, a young southerner, heads west to join the California Gold Rush. He enjoys a series of adventures and winds up in San Francisco after encountering the beautiful Juana. He ultimately makes a success as a farmer rather than a gold prospector.

References

Bibliography
 Beverly, Edward Joseph. Chasing the Sun: A Reader's Guide to Novels Set in the American West. Sunstone Press, 2008.
 Bonner Jr., John W. Bibliography of Georgia Authors, 1949-1965. University of Georgia Press, 2010.

1955 American novels
American historical novels
Novels by Frank Yerby
Dial Press books
Novels set in the 19th century
Novels set in San Francisco